The 18495 / 96 Rameswaram–Bhubaneswar Expressis an Express train belonging to Indian Railways – East Coast Railway zone that runs between  and  in India.

It operates as train number 18495 from Rameswaram to Bhubaneswar and as train number 18496 in the reverse direction serving the states of Tamil Nadu, Andhra Pradesh & Odisha.

Coaches

The 18495 / 96 Rameswaram–Bhubaneswar Express has  one AC 2 tier, Four AC 3 tier, 11 Sleeper Class, 4 General Unreserved & 2 EOG Coaches. It carries a pantry car.

As is customary with most train services in India, coach composition may be amended at the discretion of Indian Railways depending on demand.

Service

Schedule

Routeing

The 18495 / 96 Rameswaram–Bhubaneswar Express runs from Rameswaram via,
, 
, 
, 
, 

Traction

References

External links
18495 Rameswaram Bhubaneswar Express at India Rail Info
18496 Bhubaneswar Rameswaram Express at India Rail Info

Express trains in India
Rail transport in Tamil Nadu
Rail transport in Andhra Pradesh
Rail transport in Odisha
Transport in Rameswaram
Transport in Bhubaneswar